Boris Harro Gabriel Gorlee (born 22 February 2001) is a Dutch cricketer. In July 2019, he captained the Netherlands under-19 side at the Under-19 Cricket World Cup European qualifier event that was played in his home country. He was called up to the senior Netherlands squad for a tour of South Africa in November 2021. Gorlee was again selected for the squad when the Netherlands travelled to Qatar for a One Day International (ODI) series against Afghanistan in January 2022. He made his ODI debut against Afghanistan on 21 January 2021. The following month, he was named in the Dutch Twenty20 International (T20I) squad for their series against New Zealand.

References

External links
 

2001 births
Living people
Dutch cricketers
Netherlands One Day International cricketers
Sportspeople from The Hague